Hotel Panorama is located at 8A Hart Avenue, near Chatham Road South, in Tsim Sha Tsui, Hong Kong. It is managed by the Canadian Rhombus International Hotels Group, which also owns and manages LKF Hotel. It is next to the high-rise hotel Hyatt Regency Hong Kong, Tsim Sha Tsui.

See also
 List of tallest buildings in Hong Kong

References

External links

 

Hotels in Hong Kong
Tsim Sha Tsui
Hotels established in 2008
Hotel buildings completed in 2008